L-glutamyl-(BtrI acyl-carrier protein) decarboxylase (btrK (gene)) is an enzyme with systematic name L-glutamyl-(BtrI acyl-carrier protein) carboxy-lyase. This enzyme catalyses the following chemical reaction

 L-glutamyl-[BtrI acyl-carrier protein]  4-amino butanoyl-[BtrI acyl-carrier protein] + CO2

This enzyme binds pyridoxal 5'-phosphate.

References

External links 
 

EC 4.1.1